Whitcliffe Mount School is a mixed secondary school located in Cleckheaton, West Yorkshire, England.

History
It was established as Cleckheaton Secondary School in 1908 in temporary premises on Brooke Street. The school moved to its current location in the town in 1910 and was renamed Cleckheaton Secondary and Technical School. Under the Education Act 1944 the school became Whitcliffe Mount Grammar School, and when the school became comprehensive in 1973 it was renamed Whitcliffe Mount School.

Previously a voluntary controlled school administered by Kirklees Metropolitan Borough Council, in September 2022 Whitcliffe Mount School converted to academy status. The school is now sponsored by the SHARE Multi Academy Trust.

Academics
Whitcliffe Mount School offers GCSEs, BTECs and OCR Nationals as programmes of study for pupils.

Notable former pupils
Wendy Holden, writer and novelist
Sarah Holt, athlete
Paul Whitaker, cricketer
Nigel Scrutton, academic and biotechnology innovator
Reginald C. Sutcliffe, meteorologist, first Director of Research for the Meteorological Office 
Lois Toulson, diver

Whitcliffe Mount Grammar School
Jeff Butterfield, international rugby player
Nigel Weatherill, academic

References

External links
Whitcliffe Mount School official website

Secondary schools in Kirklees
Cleckheaton
Educational institutions established in 1908
1908 establishments in England
Academies in Kirklees